Virginia Van Upp (January 13, 1902 – March 25, 1970) was an American film producer and screenwriter.

Early life
Virginia Van Upp was born in Chicago, the daughter of Harry and Helen Van Upp. Mrs Van Upp had been an editor and title writer for Thomas H. Ince.

Virginia Van Upp performed in several silent films as a child actress. She soon worked her way up in the film industry becoming a script writer, film editor, script reader, casting director, and agent.

Career
Her first screenplay credit was for Paramount Pictures' The Pursuit of Happiness (1934). She was a prolific writer and re-writer of screenplays for Paramount until 1943.

Queen of Columbia
Ever on the lookout for talent, and after several writers failed to create a satisfying screenplay of Cover Girl (1944), Harry Cohn of Columbia Pictures hired Van Upp from Paramount to rewrite the script. Cover Girl was designed as a Technicolor project for Columbia's Rita Hayworth.  Cohn surrounded his star with the best talent available, such as costume designers Travis Banton and Gwen Wakeling, who had extensive experience in big budget 20th Century Fox films. Cohn was initially reluctant to have Gene Kelly from MGM as Hayworth's co-star, until he was convinced that Kelly and his assistant Stanley Donen would do the choreography for the film for no extra fee. Van Upp not only fashioned a successful screenplay from the discarded drafts, but most importantly, gained the confidence of Rita Hayworth, becoming a friend and a mediator between her and the studio - even supervising Hayworth's costumes and rewriting her own work to suit Hayworth's new persona.

Seeing the impressive results, Cohn made Van Upp an associate producer and later Executive Producer at the studio. Not only did Cohn recognize the importance of appealing to the large female audiences, while men were away during World War II, but Van Upp's broad experience in the film industry at all levels made her a rarity: as opposed to most screenwriters who resented studio interference with their work, she understood and welcomed diversity of opinion and pressure from the studio to complete a successful film.

Van Upp was only one of three female producers in Hollywood at the time. (The others were Joan Harrison who was associated with Alfred Hitchcock, and Harriet Parsons, daughter of influential gossip columnist Louella Parsons.) On January 7, 1945, The New York Times commented:
Miss Van Upp's new berth is considered to be the most important position yet for a woman at a major studio. She will have the overall supervision and preparation and actual filming of twelve to fourteen top budget pictures to be made by Columbia during the year.  Working under her will be several associate producers, all men.

As a producer, her work was often uncredited, such as the recutting of Orson Welles' vehicle for his wife Rita Hayworth, the expensive The Lady from Shanghai.

Perhaps Van Upp's best remembered production is film Gilda (1946), which she co-wrote and carefully supervised.

After making The Guilt of Janet Ames (1947) with Rosalind Russell, Van Upp left Columbia to spend time with her family. Harry Cohn rewarded her with a job inspecting the Latin American market, where she visited 14 Central and South American countries. During this visit, Van Upp announced that she would produce films based on the novels Christ the Man  and Tolvanera  by Spanish writer Dr. Ginés de La Torre, but these plans never came to fruition. It was also announced that Virginia would produce a film on the life of Rudolph Valentino for independent producer Edward Small; Small made the film several years later without her involvement.

Van Upp's script for Christ the Man, titled The Trial, about a staging of the life of Jesus Christ in a small, American town, was projected for producer/director Frank Capra.  However, on Feb. 27, 1951, Paramount announced the picture had been abandoned because of "the heavy expenditure necessary to produce it," circa $2,000,000. Capra believed the subject matter influenced the decision.

She returned to Columbia to work on Rita Hayworth's comeback film Affair in Trinidad (1952), which reunited her with Gilda co-star Glenn Ford.

A projected film at Republic Pictures was cancelled due to an illness, and she reportedly made films for the United States Army in West Germany.

Personal life
Virginia Van Upp was married twice. Her second husband was production manager Ralph W. Nelson. They were divorced in 1949. The couple had one daughter.

Filmography
The Pursuit of Happiness (1934) - screenplay
Timothy's Quest (1936) - screenplay
Too Many Parents (1936) - screenplay
Poppy (1936) - screenplay
My American Wife (1936) - uncredited writer
Easy to Take (1936) - screenplay
Swing High, Swing Low (1937) - screenplay
You and Me (1938) - screenplay
St. Louis Blues (1939) - screenplay
Honeymoon in Bali (1939) - screenplay
Cafe Society (1939) - story, screenplay
Virginia (1941) - story, screenplay
Come Live with Me (1941) - story
One Night in Lisbon (1941) - screenplay
Bahama Passage (1941) - screenplay
The Crystal Ball (1943) - screenplay
Young and Willing (1943) - screenplay
Cover Girl (1944) - screenplay
The Impatient Years (1944) - story, screenplay, associate producer
Together Again (1945) - screenplay, producer
She Wouldn't Say Yes (1945) - screenplay, producer
Gilda (1946) - producer
The Guilt of Janet Ames (1947) - uncredited producer
Here Comes the Groom (1951) - screenplay
Affair in Trinidad (1952) - story, uncredited producer

References

External links
 

1902 births
1970 deaths
Writers from Chicago
American people of Dutch descent
Film producers from Illinois
Screenwriters from Illinois
American women screenwriters
20th-century American women writers
20th-century American businesspeople
American women film producers
20th-century American screenwriters
20th-century American businesswomen